Mark Eaton (born 11 June 1953) is an Australian cricketer. He played three first-class matches for South Australia in 1976/77.

See also
 List of South Australian representative cricketers

References

External links
 

1953 births
Living people
Australian cricketers
South Australia cricketers
Cricketers from Adelaide